The President's Man: A Line in the Sand is a 2002 American made-for-television action film starring Chuck Norris and Judson Mills. It is a sequel to The President's Man. It was first shown on CBS on January 20, 2002. The film was directed by Norris' son Eric Norris and co-produced by his brother Aaron Norris.

Plot 
Secret agent Joshua McCord (Chuck Norris) is assigned by President Adam Mayfield (Robert Urich) to prevent a band of terrorists from setting off a nuclear device in a U.S. city. McCord has to infiltrate the terrorists' headquarters and disarm the bomb. Deke Slater (Judson Mills), McCord's younger assistant, develops a relationship with McCord's daughter Que (Jennifer Tung).

Cast 

 Chuck Norris as Joshua McCord
 Judson Mills as Deke Slater
 Jennifer Tung as Que McCord
 Roxanne Hart as Lydia Mayfield
 Joel Swetow as Fadhal Rashid
 Ali Afshar as Abir Rashid 
 Thom Barry as Gen. Warren Gates
 Bruce Nozick as Phillip Kaznar
 Maz Jobrani as Ali Faisal
 Kay Bailey Hutchison as Herself
 Philip Casnoff as Jack Stanton
 Robert Urich as President Adam Mayfield
 Chino Binamo as Guard #1
 Dameon Clarke as Andy Shelby
 Dan Flannery as CIA Director Carter McLain
 Jeff Grays as T.C. 
 Sean Hennigan as Dr. Arthur Everett
 James Huston as Spencer Ryan
 Maggie Parks as Barbara
 Bill Poague as Producer
 Tom Powell as Dr. Rolf Kellner
 Brett Rice as FBI Director Stephen Mornay
 Jordan Wall as Rob Daniels 
 Jack Watkins as Dan Felder
 Harout Yerganian as Rashid's Aide

See also
 List of American films of 2002
 Chuck Norris filmography

References

External links

2002 television films
2002 films
2002 action films
American action television films
Films scored by Kevin Kiner
CBS network films
Television sequel films
2000s English-language films